Matthew Maher (born 1971/1972 in Arkabutla, Mississippi) is an American television and theater actor who has appeared in, among other works, John from Cincinnati, Outer Range, and Our Flag Means Death.

He has also worked in such theaters as The Public Theater, New York Shakespeare Festival, Soho Rep, Berkeley Rep, and Actors Theater of Louisville. He has also appeared occasionally in feature films, including Captain Marvel, Funny Pages, and a number of films directed by both Ben Affleck and Kevin Smith.

Filmography

Theater (partial)
Richard III (2004, The Public Theater) (Christopher/2nd Murderer)
The School for Lies (2011, Classic Stage Company) (Acaste)
Golden Child (2012, Signature Theatre) (Reverend Baines)
Mr. Burns, a Post-Electric Play (2013, Playwrights Horizons) (Matt)
The Flick (2013, Playwrights Horizons; 2015, Barrow Street Theatre; 2016, National Theatre) (Sam)
 Othello (2016, New York Theatre Workshop) (Roderigo)
 King Lear (2019, Cort Theatre) (Oswald)

Awards
Obie, for his 1999 performance in The Foundry Theater's The Race of the Ark Tattoo
Obie, in 2013 for Sustained Excellence in Performance

References

External links
 
 
 
 

1970s births
Living people
American male television actors
American male stage actors
Obie Award recipients
People from Tate County, Mississippi